Iron(II) selenate (ferrous selenate) is an inorganic compound with the formula FeSeO4. It has anhydrous and several hydrate forms. The pentahydrate has the structure, [Fe(H2O)4]SeO4•H2O, isomorphous to the corresponding iron(II) sulfate. Heptahydrate is also known, in form of unstable green crystalline solid.

Preparation
Iron(II) selenate can be prepared by the reaction of saturated sodium selenate and iron(II) sulfate at 80 °C. When cooled to room temperature, crystalline iron(II) selenate precipitates from the solution.
 Na2SeO4 (sat.) + FeSO4 → Na2SO4 + FeSeO4
The reaction of iron and selenic acid produces iron(II) selenate as well, but with a side product:
 Fe + H2SeO4 → FeSeO4 + H2↑
 3 Fe + 4 H2SeO4 → 3 FeSeO4 + Se + 4 H2O

Other species containing oxoanion of selenium
Double salts like the Tutton's salts (NH4)2Fe(SeO4)2•6H2O and K2Fe(SeO4)2•6H2O are known.

In addition to the ferrous (Fe2+) salt, the ferric (Fe3+) salt iron(III) selenate, Fe2(SeO4)3, has also been reported.

However, iron(II) selenite (FeSeO3) is unknown, though the selenite and pyroselenite of iron(III) was published.

References

Iron(II) compounds
Selenates